Medieval rock can refer to: 

 Medieval folk rock, subgenre of electric folk and progressive folk
 Medieval metal, subgenre of folk metal
 Neo-medieval music, a varied collection of different styles within modern popular music